Cockerham Vicarage is in Rectory Road, Cockerham, Lancashire, England.  Originally a vicarage, it was later used as a nursing home.  The vicarage is recorded in the National Heritage List for England as a designated Grade II listed building.  It was built in 1843 for John Dodson, the church's rector, and designed by the Lancaster architect Edmund Sharpe.  It is constructed in sandstone with slate roofs.  The building is in three storeys, with tall chimneys and steeply pitched gables.  The doorway has a Tudor arch, and above it is a shield carved with an open Bible inscribed "ROM V" (meaning Romans, chapter 5), and a wreath inscribed with "LUCERNA PEDIBUS" (meaning "A lantern to my feet").  There is also a date stone inscribed "I.D.1843".

See also

Listed buildings in Cockerham
List of architectural works by Edmund Sharpe

References

Religious buildings and structures completed in 1843
Grade II listed buildings in Lancashire
Edmund Sharpe buildings
Clergy houses in England
Buildings and structures in the City of Lancaster
1843 establishments in England
Grade II listed houses